"I Know Where It's At" is a song by English-Canadian girl group All Saints, released in August 1997 as their debut single from their first album, All Saints (1997). The song debuted on the National Lottery Live 9 August 1997 and was first performed on Top of the Pops on 2 September same year. It became the group's first top-ten hit, peaking at number four on the UK Singles Chart. In the US, the single reached to number 36 on the Billboard Hot 100. The song additionally reached the top 20 in Australia, Canada, France, Ireland, Israel and New Zealand.

Background
"I Know Where It's At" was written by Shaznay Lewis and Karl Gordon, and produced by Gordon. Walter Becker and Donald Fagen are credited as writers because the song samples elements from Steely Dan's "The Fez".

Critical reception
The song received positive reviews from music critics. Stephen Thomas Erlewine from AllMusic picked it as one of the "standouts" from All Saints, describing it as "party-ready" and "Steely Dan-fueled". Pan-European magazine Music & Media wrote, "This all-female quartet has taken the UK by storm recently, prompting inevitable comparisons with the Spice Girls in the press. That doesn't really do them full justice—the song itself is actually very well written and the distinctive razorsharp vocal harmonies are the icing on the cake." 

A reviewer from Music Week gave "I Know Where It's At" five out of five and named it Single of the Week, adding, "The London-based four-piece girl group's label debut is virtually all strong chorus and instant rhythm. Could be a smart move, so watch this one with care." Paul Martin from The News Letter stated, "The groovy party theme is just the tonic for any winter blues. Nicole and Melanie take lead vocals and the brilliant harmonies of Natalie and Shaznay dress the song in a superb gloss." He concluded, "Undoubtedly the most impressive track on the collection." Rob Brunner from Entertainment Weekly felt that "their upbeat ditties", like "I Know Where It's At", "are their best, but even those tracks cook over a low-to-medium flame."

Music video
The accompanying music video for "I Know Where It's At" was directed by Alex Hemming. It was the first video All Saints ever released. It was to show the girls in an urban setting as the more streetwise variants of girl groups. The video was shot with very little colour, with the girls almost entirely in black and white.

Track listings

 UK CD1; Canadian and Australian CD single
 "I Know Where It's At" (Cutfather and Jo's alternative mix – radio)
 "I Know Where It's At" (original radio mix)
 "I Know Where It's At" (Cutfather and Jo's alternative mix)
 "I Know Where It's At" (original mix)

 UK CD2
 "I Know Where It's At" (K-Gee's Bounce mix)
 "I Know Where It's At" (Nu Birth Riddum dub)
 "I Know Where It's At" (Colour System Inc. Vox)
 "Alone" – 3:31

 UK cassette single
 "I Know Where It's At" (Cutfather and Jo's alternative mix)
 "I Know Where It's At" (original mix)

 US CD, 7-inch, and cassette single
 "I Know Where It's At" (Cutfather and Jo's alternative mix – radio) – 4:01
 "I Know Where It's At" (original radio mix) – 4:00

 Australian CD single re-release
 "I Know Where It's At" (original mix)
 "I Know Where It's At" (original radio mix)
 "I Know Where It's At" (Nu Birth Riddum dub)
 "Never Ever" (Booker T's vocal mix)
 "Alone"

 Japanese CD single
 "I Know Where It's At" (Cutfather and Jo's alternative mix – radio)
 "I Know Where It's At" (Cutfather and Jo's alternative mix)
 "I Know Where It's At" (original mix)
 "Alone"

Charts and certifications

Weekly charts

Year-end charts

Certifications

Release history

References

External links
 Official site

1997 songs
1997 debut singles
All Saints (group) songs
London Records singles
Song recordings produced by Cameron McVey
Songs written by Donald Fagen
Songs written by K-Gee
Songs written by Shaznay Lewis
Songs written by Walter Becker